Nunca te olvidaré (English: Never forget you) is a Mexican telenovela produced by Juan Osorio and Carlos Moreno Laguillo for Televisa in 1999. It is based on a novel by Caridad Bravo Adams. It aired on Canal de Las Estrellas from January 18, 1999 to May 28, 1999.

Edith González and Fernando Colunga starred as protagonists, while Alma Muriel, Humberto Elizondo, Eugenia Cauduro and Alejandra Procuna starred as antagonists.

Plot
Don Antonio Uribe lives with his family on his ranch, near the city of Guanajuato. One day, he receives a message from Clara Isabel Martel, his young love, calling him to his deathbed. Clara Isabel begs him as a last will to take care of her daughter, Esperanza, and he promises to be a second father to the girl. Consuelo, Antonio's wife, resents Esperanza's presence and treats her very badly, while her son, Luis Gustavo, is immediately attracted to Esperanza. Consuelo is enraged by her son's feelings and decides to separate the children by sending Luis Gustavo to study abroad and putting Esperanza in a school run by nuns.

On the other hand, Fermín Requena, Antonio's neighbor and friend, is a widower and has a daughter, Silvia, who is spoiled and self-centered. Silvia is jealous of the affection that Luis Gustavo feels for Esperanza and pressures her father to also send her to study abroad so that she can be close to Luis Gustavo. However, Luis Gustavo is unable to forget Esperanza and sees Silvia only as a friend.

Ten years later, Esperanza, turned into a beautiful young woman, returns to the ranch to take care of Don Antonio, who is mortally ill. There he meets the Moraima brothers, who now own almost all of Don Antonio's land, won by a legal dispute that Fermín lost. One of the brothers, Juan Moraima, falls in love with Esperanza.

Before dying, Don Antonio gives Fermín a letter for his son in which he gives him the blessing if he decides to marry Esperanza. Luis Gustavo returns home for the funeral and when he sees Esperanza, he falls madly in love with her. However, Esperanza's beauty also awakens love in Fermín's heart; Determined to possess her, he hides the letter and hatches a sinister plan with the help of Consuelo to permanently separate the couple.

Consuelo makes Luis Gustavo believe that Esperanza is her father's illegitimate daughter, and therefore her half-sister. Horrified, Luis Gustavo decides to commit himself to Silvia and immediately leaves the country, abandoning the woman he loves, without having the courage to reveal the truth of his abandonment. Esperanza remains disappointed, believing that Luis Gustavo has stopped loving her, while he suffers in silence for that love.

Cast

Main 
 Edith González as Esperanza Gamboa Martel / Isabel Clara Martel
 Fernando Colunga as Luis Gustavo Uribe Del Valle
 Alma Muriel as Consuelo Del Valle de Uribe

Secondary

Recurring 
 Eric del Castillo as Licenciado Mendez
 Julio Alemán as Juez Mancebo

Special participation 
 Josefina Echánove as Sor Margarita
 Octavio Galindo as Dr. Carlos Bárcenas
 Amparo Garrido as Madre Superiora
 Jaime Lozano as Higinio Sánchez
 Carlos Rotzinger as Arcadio
 Gustavo Negrete as Justo

Guest starts 
 Johnny Laboriel as Johnny
 Tony Flores as Unknown character
 Toño Infante as Braulio
 Bárbara Ferré as Bárbara

Awards and nominations

References

External links

1999 telenovelas
Mexican telenovelas
1999 Mexican television series debuts
1999 Mexican television series endings
Spanish-language telenovelas
Television shows set in Mexico
Televisa telenovelas